The simbing is an malian harp-lute, used by the Mandinka people of Mali, and Mandinka and Jola peoples of Senegal and Gambia. The instruments consist of a calabash resonator, a (usually curved) stick for a neck, a metal jingle attached to the neck, and a bridge that holds the string over the skin soundboard in a vertical line. For comparison lutes (such as the guitar) usually have the strings held in a horizontal line above the soundboard. The instruments have five to nine strings. The instrument from the 1790s was reported as having seven strings by Mungo Park.

The instrument was played in Mandinka and Jola cultures in the context of hunting. With the Mandingas, the instrument was played by "the hunter's musician" who narrated songs about the hunt and the animals. With the Jolas, the instrument is used to accompany men singing in groups.

The instrument strings were plucked to make noise. Also, the calabash gourd could be tapped with sticks by the singer, for percussion.

References

Harps
West African musical instruments
String instruments
Harp lutes